Gävleborg County held a county council election on 19 September 2010, on the same day as the general and municipal elections.

Results
The number of seats remained at 75 with the Social Democrats winning the most at 28, a drop of one from 2006. The party gained 36.8% of an overall valid vote of 172,739.

Municipalities

Images

References

Elections in Gävleborg County
Gävleborg